This is a list of newspapers in the British Virgin Islands.

Official
The Virgin Islands Official Gazette

Daily newspapers 

There are none, although The Virgin Islands Daily News from the neighbouring U.S. Virgin Islands has a moderate circulation in the British Virgin Islands.

Weekly newspapers 
BVI Beacon
Island Sun

Defunct newspapers 
The BVI Standpoint

See also
 British Virgin Islands news websites

British Virgin Islands
 List
Newspapers

Newspapers